Azhagam Perumal is an Indian film director and actor.

Career
Azhagam Perumal hails from the village of Kulasekharapuram in Kanyakumari District, Tamil Nadu. All his family members were working in the government service and his parents wanted him to be an engineer. Azhagam Perumal, however, after his graduation, applied to the Adyar Film Institute in spite of stiff opposition from his family. He graduated with a Gold Medal from the Institute in 1991.

Azhagam Perumal worked as an assistant to director Mani Ratnam from Thalapathi to Iruvar, before leaving to make his independent project. When Mani Ratnam was shooting Alaipayuthey, he was looking for someone like Jagathy Sreekumar to play the quirky house owner, which Azhagam Perumal eventually did, making his acting debut.

He had initially announced his directorial debut in 1998 as Mudhal Mudhalaaga, a romantic film starring Arvind Swamy and Karisma Kapoor. Despite beginning production, the film was indefinitely put on hold. He then started making Udhaya in 1999 with Vijay and Simran starring, but the film faced production delays owing to the producer's financial problems. Azhagam Perumal also discussed making a film titled Hijack in 2000 but the film failed to develop. He later attempted to make the film with Vikram in 2004, but the project did not proceed.

His directorial debut was eventually the romantic comedy Dumm Dumm Dumm starring R. Madhavan and Jyothika, in which his mentor Mani Ratnam worked as the screenwriter and producer. The film released in 2001 and was a success.

After Alaipayuthey, he was offered acting offers but he declined as he wanted to revive and complete Udhaya by early 2004.

Filmography
All films and series are in Tamil unless otherwise noted.

Directorial

Acting
Films

Web series

Dubbing artist

References

External links
 

Tamil film directors
Living people
Film directors from Tamil Nadu
Tamil male actors
1965 births
People from Kanyakumari district
Male actors in Malayalam cinema
Male actors in Tamil cinema
21st-century Indian male actors
21st-century Indian film directors
Indian male film actors